The 2023 Lewis Flyers men's volleyball team represents Lewis University in the 2023 NCAA Division I & II men's volleyball season. The Flyers, led by nineteenth year head coach Dan Friend, play their home games at Neil Carey Arena. The Flyers are members of the Midwestern Intercollegiate Volleyball Association and were picked to finish fourth the MIVA in the preseason poll.

Season highlights
Will be filled in as the season progresses.

Roster

Schedule
TV/Internet Streaming information:
All home games will be televised on GLVC SN. All road games will also be streamed on the oppositions streaming service. 

 *-Indicates conference match.
 Times listed are Central Time Zone.

Announcers for televised games
UC Irvine: No commentary
BYU: Jarom Jordan, Steve Vail, & Kenzie Koerber  
Missouri S&T: Logan Kap, Allie Lankowicz, & Rachel Kaczorowski
King: Allie Lankowicz & Chloe Fornetti
UC San Diego: Allie Lankowicz & Hannah Alvey
Stanford: Rob Espero & Bill Walton 
Pepperdine: Rob Espero & Bill Walton
St. Francis Brooklyn: 
Maryville: 
George Mason: 
Mount Olive: 
Ball State: 
Ohio State: 
Quincy: 
Lindenwood: 
Loyola Chicago: 
Purdue Fort Wayne: 
McKendree: 
Maryville: 
Queens: 
Erskine: 
McKendree: 
Loyola Chicago: 
Purdue Fort Wayne: 
Ohio State: 
Ball State:
Lindenwood: 
Quincy:

Rankings 

^The Media did not release a Pre-season or Week 1 poll.

References

2023 in sports in Illinois
2023 NCAA Division I & II men's volleyball season
2023 Midwestern Intercollegiate Volleyball Association season